The 2015 Copa Libertadores final stages were played from April 28 to August 5, 2015. A total of 16 teams competed in the final stages to decide the champions of the 2015 Copa Libertadores.

Qualified teams
The winners and runners-up of each of the eight groups in the second stage qualified for the final stages.

Seeding
The qualified teams were seeded in the final stages according to their results in the second stage, with the group winners seeded 1–8, and the group runners-up seeded 9–16.

Format
In the final stages, the 16 teams played a single-elimination tournament, with the following rules:
Each tie was played on a home-and-away two-legged basis, with the higher-seeded team hosting the second leg. However, CONMEBOL required that the second leg of the finals had to be played in South America, i.e., if there was a finalist from Mexico, they would have to host the first leg regardless of seeding.
In the round of 16, quarterfinals, and semifinals, if tied on aggregate, the away goals rule would be used. If still tied, the penalty shoot-out would be used to determine the winner (no extra time would be played).
In the finals, if tied on aggregate, the away goals rule would not be used, and 30 minutes of extra time would be played. If still tied after extra time, the penalty shoot-out would be used to determine the winner.
If there were two semifinalists from the same association, they would have to play each other.

Bracket
The bracket of the final stages was determined by the seeding as follows:
Round of 16:
Match A: Seed 1 vs. Seed 16
Match B: Seed 2 vs. Seed 15
Match C: Seed 3 vs. Seed 14
Match D: Seed 4 vs. Seed 13
Match E: Seed 5 vs. Seed 12
Match F: Seed 6 vs. Seed 11
Match G: Seed 7 vs. Seed 10
Match H: Seed 8 vs. Seed 9
Quarterfinals:
Match S1: Winner A vs. Winner H
Match S2: Winner B vs. Winner G
Match S3: Winner C vs. Winner F
Match S4: Winner D vs. Winner E
Semifinals: (if there were two semifinalists from the same association, they would have to play each other)
Match F1: Winner S1 vs. Winner S4
Match F2: Winner S2 vs. Winner S3
Finals: Winner F1 vs. Winner F2

Round of 16
The first legs were played on April 28 and May 5–7, and the second legs were played on May 5 and 12–14, 2015.

|}

Match A

The second leg was suspended after River Plate players were attacked with pepper spray by Boca Juniors fans when the squad returned to the field following halftime, with the match still 0–0 (River Plate leading 1–0 on aggregate). CONMEBOL opened disciplinary proceedings against Boca Juniors, and decided to disqualify them from the tournament on May 16, 2015. River Plate advanced to the quarterfinals (Match S1).

Match B

UANL won 3–2 on aggregate and advanced to the quarterfinals (Match S2).

Match C

Internacional won 5–3 on aggregate and advanced to the quarterfinals (Match S3).

Match D

Guaraní won 3–0 on aggregate and advanced to the quarterfinals (Match S4).

Match E

Racing won 3–2 on aggregate and advanced to the quarterfinals (Match S4).

Match F

Santa Fe won 3–2 on aggregate and advanced to the quarterfinals (Match S3).

Match G

Emelec won 2–1 on aggregate and advanced to the quarterfinals (Match S2).

Match H

Tied 1–1 on aggregate, Cruzeiro won on penalties and advanced to the quarterfinals (Match S1).

Quarterfinals
The first legs were played on May 19–21, and the second legs were played on May 26–28, 2015.

|}

Match S1

River Plate won 3–1 on aggregate and advanced to the semifinals (Match F1).

Match S2

UANL won 2–1 on aggregate and advanced to the semifinals (Match F2).

Match S3

Internacional won 2–1 on aggregate and advanced to the semifinals (Match F2).

Match S4

Guaraní won 1–0 on aggregate and advanced to the semifinals (Match F1).

Semifinals
The first legs were played on July 14–15, and the second legs were played on July 21–22, 2015.

|}

Match F1

River Plate won 3–1 on aggregate and advanced to the finals.

Match F2

UANL won 4–3 on aggregate and advanced to the finals.

Finals

The finals were played on a home-and-away two-legged basis. If tied on aggregate, the away goals rule would not be used, and 30 minutes of extra time would be played. If still tied after extra time, the penalty shoot-out would be used to determine the winner.

Since UANL are from Mexico, they had to host the first leg regardless of seeding (Regulations Article 3.7b: "El Torneo deberá indefectiblemente finalizar en un país perteneciente al continente sudamericano. Para tal caso, de llegar a las finales un equipo que no pertenece al continente sudamericano, deberá indefectiblemente jugar su primer partido de local." English translation: "The Tournament shall invariably end in a country belonging to the South American continent. Therefore, provided that a team not belonging to the South American continent qualifies to the finals, it shall invariably play the first leg at its home.")

The first leg was played on July 29, and the second leg was played on August 5, 2015.

References

External links
 
Copa Libertadores 2015, CONMEBOL.com 

3